Silvana Lazzarino  (19 May 1933) is a former female tennis player from Italy. She reached the semifinals at 1954 French Championships.  In doubles, she reached the French semifinals in 1953, 1957 and 1964. Her best results at Wimbledon was reaching the third round in singles in 1960 and the quarterfinals in doubles in 1954 and 1960.

She and partner Lea Pericoli reached five women's doubles finals in six years (1962-1965, 1967) at the Italian International Championships.

See also
 Best result of an Italian tennis player in Grand Slam

References
 

1933 births
Italian female tennis players
Living people
Tennis players from Rome